Palo Solo is a village in the Soriano Department of western Uruguay.

References

Populated places in the Soriano Department